Luck by Chance is a 2009 Indian Hindi-language drama film written and directed by Zoya Akhtar in her directorial debut. Produced by Farhan Akhtar and Ritesh Sidhwani, it stars Farhan Akhtar and Konkana Sen Sharma in lead roles, with Rishi Kapoor, Dimple Kapadia, Juhi Chawla, Sanjay Kapoor, Isha Sharvani, Alyy Khan and Sheeba Chaddha in pivotal supporting roles and Hrithik Roshan and Saif Ali Khan in speciall appearance. Guest stars and industry folk starring as themselves included Shah Rukh Khan, Aamir Khan, Abhishek Bachchan, Akshaye Khanna, Kareena Kapoor Khan, Rani Mukerji, Karan Johar, Manish Malhotra, Ranbir Kapoor, John Abraham, Vivek Oberoi, Rajkumar Hirani, Boman Irani and Anurag Kashyap in cameos. The film shows the journey of an aspiring actor who arrives in Mumbai to become a movie star. How he finds himself riding his fortune to becoming one, while struggling to sustain his relationships, forms the story.

Luck by Chance released on 30 January 2009, and was a moderate commercial success. However, it received widespread critical acclaim, with major praise for its novel concept, story, screenplay, dialogues and performances of the cast.

At the 55th Filmfare Awards, Luck by Chance received 5 nominations, including Best Supporting Actor (Rishi) and Best Supporting Actress (Kapadia), and won Best Debut Director (Zoya, tying with Ayan Mukerji for Wake Up Sid).

Plot
Young actor Vikram Jaisingh arrives in Mumbai to make it as a Bollywood film star with the help of Abhimanyu, an actor friend from his hometown, and their mutual friend Sameer, who works in a studio props department.

Vikram befriends Abhimanyu's neighbor, young actress Sona Mishra, with whom he eventually becomes romantically involved. Sona, the protégé of small-time producer Satish Chowdhury, who for three years has promised her a leading role in his dream project, meanwhile works in regional films and bit parts.

Sona finds out that Satish has secured financing for the new project and meets him expecting him to cast her as second heroine, but he refuses saying that they need a new face and since she has acted in many regional films and other small roles she is no longer a fresh face. She argues that she can act well but he says that is not a major criterion these days in Bollywood. Sona is crying when Satish's wife enters and asks her why she is crying but Sona for unknown reasons, withholds the reasons for her emotions and answers by fabricating a lie about trouble at home. Sona while leaving the both of them gives photos of Vikram to Satish who shows it to his wife and who in turn shows them to Romy.

Vikram is shortlisted for Romy's new movie. Neena, the mom of Nikki, the actress cast for the movie, was a big film actress in the heyday. She sees Vikram's audition and tries to remember where has she met him before. Vikram had once approached her at a film fraternity party. Vikram is told his audition was for the lead in the film and that Neena has seen his audition. At home, he sees every movie Neena has starred in and he impresses her with his charm and knowledge about her work. Recalling past advice, Vikram successfully boosts a competing actor's ego whose overconfident acting is rejected by the director. Finally, Vikram is selected by Neena, Ranjit (director of the film), and Romy's wife, despite Romy's desire to cast the other macho, hunky actor.

On set, Vikram becomes increasingly crafty and manipulative, while Nikki is smitten by him and sneaks into his room one night while her mother is asleep in an attempt to seduce him. Vikram succumbs to her advances and a secret affair starts between the two; the affair becomes stronger when Neena has to leave the set on business for a few days. Vikram tells Nikki he has no girlfriend. Meanwhile, Sona arrives at the hotel where the cast is staying to surprise Vikram. Her friend who is also working on the film warns her of a blossoming romance between Vikram and Nikki. Since Vikram has stayed in touch with her, Sona doesn't take heed of her friend's warning but discovers the truth when she sees Vikram's unexpectedly cold behavior towards her. Hurt, she leaves the hotel. After coming back, Neena instantly recognizes that something is going on between them and makes them understand that it will be mutually beneficial not to let the press and public know of their intimacy.

Meanwhile, in Mumbai, news of the affair has leaked and a friend of Sona who works at a tabloid is assigned to prepare the article, which describes Vikram as a user who has shot to stardom by manipulating Neena and her daughter Nikki. The article also mentions details of when he was struggling to land a role and Sona's part in his life as the forgotten girlfriend. Neena gets very upset and yells at the magazine editor and tells Nikki to stay away from Vikram. Vikram and Nikki have a fight, and Vikram shows his frustration to Sona as he believes she is the one responsible for the article.

Eventually the film is released and it becomes a superhit. Vikram rises to stardom but at the expense of his friends. At a party, he meets his idol Shah Rukh Khan, who advises him to not fall into the trappings of stardom and to always stay close to the people who stood by him when he was a nobody. He tries to get back with Sona, but she points out that he only wants to be with her because he is selfish and feels guilty. She refuses and walks out of his life. Sona soon gets good roles on television and is interviewed by a reporter for her fan following. The film ends with her telling the reporter that she is happy living the life of an independent and somewhat successful actress instead of being upset about not becoming a major movie star.

Cast
 Farhan Akhtar as Vikram Jaisingh 
 Konkona Sen Sharma as Sona Mishra 
 Rishi Kapoor as Rommy Rolly 
 Dimple Kapadia as Neena Walia
 Juhi Chawla as Minty Rolly
 Hrithik Roshan as Zaffar Khan (Special appearance)
 Saif Ali Khan as Aslam Khan (Special appearance)
 Sanjay Kapoor as Ranjit Rolly 
 Isha Sharvani as Nikki Walia
 Alyy Khan as Satish Chaudhary
 Sheeba Chaddha as Pinky Chaudhary
 Saurabh Shukla as Nand Kishore
 Arjun Mathur as Abhimanyu 'Abhi' Gupta 
 Sid Makkar as Sameer
 Pankaj Kalra as Raju 
 Arvind Vaidya as Pandit Ji

Guest Appearances (alphabetical order) 
 Aamir Khan 
 Abhishek Bachchan 
 Akshaye Khanna
 Boman Irani 
 Dia Mirza
 Javed Akhtar
 John Abraham
 Karan Johar
 Kareena Kapoor Khan
 Mac Mohan
 Manish Acharya
 Manish Malhotra
 Mushtaq Shiekh
 Rajkumar Hirani
 Ranbir Kapoor
 Rani Mukerji
 Ronit Roy
 Shabana Azmi
 Shah Rukh Khan
 Vivek Oberoi

Production

Development
Zoya Akhtar said in an interview that she wrote the first draft 7 years ago while relaxing on Palolem beach in Goa. In an interview she said:
I hand wrote it and it was some ridiculous, epic-length when I came back and transcribed it on my laptop. The first film is the easiest to write because it's usually what the person knows their personal graphs, milieu and feelings. Luck By Chance is not about established actors, but those who are waiting for things to happen. Farhan's character is fresh off the boat, while Konkana's does bit roles, while looking for a big break.

The production team went through a host of names, like Madhuri Dixit, Saif Ali Khan, Kajol, Karisma Kapoor, Tabu, and Rani Mukerji. Having seen a lot of struggling actors come to Mumbai to make a living out of Bollywood, Zoya found it was easy to write the script for the film without any research. She was inspired to write this film by a lot of Bollywood-inspired movies like Guddi (1971), Rangeela (1995), and Om Shanti Om (2007).

Javed Akhtar wrote the dialogues for the film, incorporating, as Zoya puts it, his bizarre sense of humor. Farhan had to reportedly train to get six pack abs for the film. He was trained by Cheetah Yagnesh, who appeared on the film as the trainer of Farhan's character.

Filming faced a lot of problems, including the unpredictable Mumbai rains, which halted a song shoot with Hrithik Roshan. The rains washed out the entire set, and eventually the entire tent began to leak. Zoya was afraid that this would lead to short-circuit, and so all the lights had to be switched off.

According to Farhan, principal photography for the film was completed in October 2008.

Casting
Zoya Akhtar cast her brother Farhan to play the lead role after it was suggested to her by director Reema Kagti. She became convinced after seeing Farhan's performance in The Fakir of Venice. She said in an interview, "Farhan was the perfect choice for the role in Luck By Chance because he knows the industry in and out. He is smart and bright and both of us have been working together for years." Problems arose with the huge casting of the film. Zoya said, "I had to really think it out when I was deciding on these multiple actors that I wanted in the film. It was tough to decide especially because I wanted the right actors who could play themselves and still look believable as part of the film. Then there are other good actors like Boman Irani and Saurabh Shukla, who are playing characters in the film". Next to be cast were her parents, Javed Akhtar and Shabana Azmi, along with such veteran stars as Rishi Kapoor and Dimple Kapadia. Zoya said, "We could have had Shabana (Azmi) as the diva, but I needed a mainstream heroine. Only a leading lady would do. Dimple has played it edgy. She's all warm, soft sunshine and then there's a flip and she's hard, cold, steely". Isha Sharvani teams up again with Hrithik Roshan after appearing together in an ad. Juhi Chawla joined the cast playing Minty, the wife of producer Rommy Rolly.

Promotion

The producers decided to go with subtle promotion, letting audiences explore the film by themselves. The main trailer for the film was released in the last week of December 2008. It introduced the main characters and set the pace for what the plot was about. BigFlix, a part of Reliance BIG Entertainment Ltd., was given the task of promoting the film. The first bit of promotion came from the music wherein winners were given signed albums by Farhan Akhtar and Konkona Sen Sharma. They promoted the whole film across the nation in all 112 stores in 10 cities as well to the international audiences through its video-on-demand (VOD) site. The pre-release promotional activities included online marketing and publicity of the film's music videos, trailers, downloads, previews, preview shows, contests and continued with other promotional activities post-release like meet-and-greet events with the star cast at select cities.

A unique promotional campaign was launched by producers Farhan Akhtar and Ritesh Sidhwani called "Auto By Chance". They introduced 10 "Auto by Chance" three-wheelers in suburban Mumbai that would transport people for free to the destination of their choice in the suburbs. The promotion was run in conjunction with Big FM radio station and Godrej. One passenger would be interviewed live by an RJ and go on air with his experience of getting lucky and enjoying the free ride. The Indian gaming portal Zapak.com created a microsite for the movie with a game, "Luck by Chance - Lucky Break".

Release

Luck by Chance was initially scheduled to be released 23 January 2009, alongside Raaz - The Mystery Continues, but was pushed to 30 January. Luck by Chance was released on 900 screens worldwide in 27 countries. Of this, over 700 screens were in India and the rest were in overseas markets such as the United States, Canada, UK, UAE, Australia, South Africa, and New Zealand. Luck By Chance's DVD was published by UTV Home Video.
Luck By Chance's television premiere took place on Star Plus.

Reception

Critical reception
Luck By Chance received widespread critical acclaim upon release. Anupama Chopra of NDTV wrote, "Zoya pokes fun at Bollywood but she does it with a great affection. There are some lovely little moments like the star daughter in a super short skin-tight outfit struggling to touch her producer's feet without splitting a seam. But what makes Luck By Chance compelling is the layers beneath the laughs. Though the first half wobbles precariously as the script struggles to find a momentum, but thankfully the narrative flows better in the latter half and culminates in a satisfying, bittersweet end". In the review at UAE Daily the United Arab Emirates reviewer said, "One of the prime reasons why Luck By Chance works is because [of] the writing...Right from the characters, to the individualistic scenes, to the way Zoya puts them in a sequence, Luck By Chance is easily one of the most cohesive scripts this side of the Atlantic. If Zoya's writing is superb, her execution of the written material deserves distinction marks". The Times of India said, "Luck By Chance highlights how the film industry give regards to everything else but the story when making a movie and ironically weaves a fascinating story using that paradox". Noyon Jyoti Parasara of AOL.in cited some drawbacks and said, "Luck By Chance provides you some smiles throughout the movie. However, it fails to leave you with the content smile that a feel-good movie ideally aims to do."

On the review aggregator website Rotten Tomatoes, the film holds an approval rating of 80%, based on 15 reviews with an average score of 6.78/10. Neil Genzlinger of The New York Times said, "It might seem as if Bollywood couldn't possibly satirize itself – the genre is already so over-the-top – but Zoya Akhtar manages the trick deftly in Luck by Chance...A fabulous circus-theme musical number pulls out all the stops, but a scene in which an acting teacher explains why Hindi stars have to be more talented than those in Hollywood is a subtle comic gem"...[I]t is Mr. Akhtar whose understated performance holds together this far-ranging, cameo-filled film. He manages to remain sympathetic even while wreaking romantic havoc". Frank Lovece of Film Journal International characterized it as, "The Player (1992) meets All About Eve (1950) in this seriocomic satire of the Bollywood film industry by a first-time director whose collaring of over a dozen major Hindi stars for cameos speaks well of its biting accuracy", while Kyle Smith of the New York Post found it "gently humorous" and "almost totally lacking in the cynicism, self-hatred and ennui that characterizes inside-Hollywood flicks".

Box office
Luck by Chance had a slow start at the box office and registered 25% to 30% attendance. According to trade analyst and critic Joginder Tuteja, the occupancy at the theatres came down to 50%. Outside India, the film performed as per expectations.

In the US, Luck by Chance debuted at number 32. In its opening weekend, it collected $217,439 (approximately Rs. 1.06 crores) on 61 screens, a per-screen average of $3,556. In the UK, Luck By Chance debuted at number 21 and collected £73,822 (approximately Rs. 50.95 lacs) on 50 screens, with a per-screen average of £1,476. The film did very well in Australia and was a hit in India, grossing $3,914,500 at the box office. Worldwide, the film grossed $4,504,365.

Awards 

 55th Filmfare Awards:

Won

 Best Debut Director – Zoya Akhtar (shared with Ayan Mukerji for Wake Up Sid)

Nominated

 Best Supporting Actor – Rishi Kapoor
 Best Supporting Actress – Dimple Kapadia
 Best Story – Zoya Akhtar
 Best Screenplay – Zoya Akhtar

Soundtrack

References

External links
 
 Official trailer at Excel Entertainment
 
 
 
 

2009 films
2000s Hindi-language films
Films about films
Films about Bollywood
Films directed by Zoya Akhtar
Films about actors
Reliance Entertainment films
2009 directorial debut films